Newell is an unincorporated community in Mecklenburg County, North Carolina, United States. The community is located along the northeastern edge of Charlotte, and parts of it have been annexed by the city. Newell has a post office with ZIP code 28126.

References

Unincorporated communities in Mecklenburg County, North Carolina
Unincorporated communities in North Carolina